Scratching the Surface is the debut album by British band Groundhogs, released in 1968 by Liberty Records.

Track listing
All tracks composed by Tony McPhee, except where indicated.
 "Rocking Chair" – 4:07
 "Early in the Morning" (John Lee Williamson) – 4:47
 "Waking Blues" – 2:29
 "Married Men" – 4:40
 "No More Doggin'" – 4:57
 "Man Trouble" – 6:27
 "Come Back Baby" – 3:54
 "You Don't Love Me" (Willie Cobbs) – 4:11
 "Still a Fool" (McKinley Morganfield) – 6:35

1990 bonus tracks
"Oh death" – 3:14
"Gasoline" – 4:49
"Rock Me" –	2:46
"Don't Pass the Hat Around" – 3:43

Personnel
Groundhogs
Tony McPhee – guitar, vocals
Steve Rye – harmonica, vocals, lead vocals on tracks 2 and 8
Peter Cruickshank – bass
Ken Pustelnik – drums
Technical
Gerry Collins – engineer
Andrew Lauder, Roy Fisher, Tony McPhee – coordination 
Woody Woodward – art direction
Ron Wolin – design
Michael Hasted – cover photography

References

1968 debut albums
The Groundhogs albums
Liberty Records albums
World Pacific Records albums
Sundazed Records albums
Fire Records (UK) albums